Jogues is a dispersed rural community and unincorporated place in geographic Way Township, Cochrane District in Northeastern Ontario, Canada. Jogues is also a designated place served by a local services board.

The community is located on Ontario Highway 583 and the Algoma Central Railway; the railway location is also known as Stavert. In the case of the railway, Jogues lies between the communities of Coppell to the south and Wyborn (today part of and on the west side of Hearst) to the north; and in the case of the highway, between Coppell to the south and central Hearst to the north.

The community is mainly French-speaking, has a church, and children are bussed to Hearst for school.

Demographics 

References

Other map sources:

Communities in Cochrane District
Designated places in Ontario
Local services boards in Ontario